Héctor Licudi Bottaro (Gibraltar – 21 October 1959 in Madrid) was a Gibraltarian journalist and writer. His most important work was Barbarita, a novel written in Spanish and published in English and Spanish in 1929. It explores the relationship of Gibraltar and the United Kingdom.

External links 

 http://hemeroteca.abc.es/nav/Navigate.exe/hemeroteca/madrid/abc/1959/10/23/054.html
 La creación literaria en Gibraltar

Gibraltarian writers
1959 deaths
Year of birth missing